Martin James Durkin (1900–1981) was an American criminal and car thief. He is credited as the first man to kill a federal agent and was the subject of an intense manhunt by the Federal Bureau of Investigation. Personally led by J. Edgar Hoover, then recently appointed Director of the FBI, it was one of the first major investigations by the agency, who were led by Durkin on a three-month chase through five states before his capture in 1926.

Biography
In late 1925, Durkin came under investigation by federal authorities for violation of the Dyer Act. A professional car thief, the 25-year-old was suspected of transporting stolen cars across state lines. On October 11, 1925, Durkin was followed to a Chicago garage by federal Special Agent Edwin C. Shanahan. When Shanahan approached the car Durkin was in he surprised him and Durkin shot him in the chest. The story received instant national attention because Shanahan was the first federal agent to be killed in the line of duty .

The reaction from the FBI was particularly aggressive and widely considered "a matter of pride and personal security" among virtually the entire agency. According to popular lore, FBI Director J. Edgar Hoover called an aide to his office after hearing news of Shanahan's death and said "We've got to get Durkin. If one man from the Bureau is killed, and the killer is permitted to get away, our agents will never be safe. We can't let him get away with it."

Hoover authorized one of the first and largest manhunts in the FBI's history, which stretched across the country and included several major cities. Durkin did not immediately flee Chicago and remained in the city until eventually traveling to California. Federal agents followed him to California, where he was involved in a San Diego car theft, and then to Arizona, New Mexico and Texas. In El Paso, Durkin was stopped by a local sheriff who noticed Durkin carrying a pistol. He was then traveling with his girlfriend in a stolen Cadillac but falsely claimed that he was a deputy sheriff from California and was passing through on vacation. The sheriff allowed Durkin to retrieve his police identification from a nearby hotel but they instead took the opportunity to escape by driving into the Texas desert.

The FBI soon arrived in El Paso, shortly after Durkin's abandoned car was found wrecked and partially buried in mesquite. Investigators found a rancher who recalled a man and woman who had shown up at his home and asked for a lift to the nearest town. He agreed to drive them to Girvin and remembered overhearing a conversation the couple had which suggested they planned to catch a train in Alpine, Texas, the seat in Brewster County.

Although only 50 miles away from the Mexican border, authorities believed that Durkin would remain in the United States and most likely arrange travel to a large metropolitan area. A railroad ticket agent in Alpine identified Durkin as the man who had bought railroad tickets from him to San Antonio and from there to St. Louis. Durkin had already boarded a train to St. Louis on January 20, 1926, and was scheduled to arrive in the city at 11:00 am that same day. Investigators immediately phoned the FBI office in Missouri to intercept him and, cooperating with St. Louis police, had the train stopped at a small town just outside the St. Louis city limits. With the station surrounded on all sides by open farmland, there was little chance for Durkin to escape, and the train was boarded by federal agents and police officers, who arrested the fugitive in his private compartment before he could reach for his guns.

Durkin confessed to the murder of Shanahan once in custody but, as killing an FBI agent was not yet a federal crime, he was tried and convicted by the state of Illinois for murder and sentenced to 35 years imprisonment. Durkin was then tried in federal court, where he received 15 additional years for violations of the Dyer Act, but they were unable to prosecute him for the murder of Shanahan. Durkin spent almost 20 years at the Illinois state prison and, after his release on August 8, 1945, he was transferred to Leavenworth Federal Penitentiary where he remained until his parole on July 28, 1954. Durkin died in 1981.

References

External links

1900s births
1981 deaths
Prohibition-era gangsters
American people convicted of murdering police officers
People from Chicago
People convicted of murder by Illinois
Prisoners and detainees of the United States federal government
Irish emigrants to the United States (before 1923)